Ning Wang may refer to:

Wang Ning (disambiguation), Chinese people with the surname Wang
Prince of Ning (disambiguation)